The Australia national cricket team toured England from June to September 2015 for a five-match Test series, five One Day International (ODI) matches and one Twenty20 International (T20I). The Test series was for the Ashes. They also played two four-day and two three-day first-class matches against English county sides. Australia also played one ODI against Ireland in Belfast.

England

Squads
On 31 March 2015, Australia announced a 17-man touring party for the Ashes series. England announced their squad for the first Test on 1 July. Australia fast-bowler Ryan Harris announced his retirement from cricket days before the start of the series, due to an ongoing knee injury. He was subsequently replaced by New South Wales fast bowler Pat Cummins. On 12 August 2015, Australia announced a 14-man squad for the ODI series, with Steve Smith captaining the team. England announced their squads for the T20 and ODI series on 24 August.

1 Cummins replaced Ryan Harris, who retired prior to the start of the series due to his knee injury.
2 Bairstow replaced Gary Ballance in the squad for the third Test.
3 Plunkett and Footitt replaced James Anderson in the squad for the fourth Test. Anderson returned to the squad in place of Footitt for the fifth Test.
4 Bairstow replaced Jos Buttler in the squad for the third ODI.
5Aaron Finch replaced David Warner in the squad for the third ODI, after Warner retired hurt with a thumb fracture. The next day, Peter Handscomb and John Hastings were called into the side in place of the injured Nathan Coulter-Nile and Shane Watson, who announced his retirement from Test Cricket.

Tour matches

First-class: Kent v Australians

First-class: Essex v Australians

First-class: Derbyshire v Australians

First-class: Northamptonshire v Australians

Test series

First Test

Second Test

Third Test

Fourth Test

Fifth Test

T20I series

Only T20I

ODI series

1st ODI

2nd ODI

3rd ODI

4th ODI

5th ODI

Ireland

Squads

ODI series

Only ODI

References

External links
Australia tour of England and Ireland, 2015 at ESPNcricinfo.com

2015
2015 in English cricket
International cricket competitions in 2015